The Alvear was a Brazilian single-engine, single-seat aircraft.

Design and development
Her structure was made of wood paraná pine wing ribs and beech stringers, and externally covered with varnished linho. The engine was a 7-cylinder 60HP Gnome rotary type, with wooden Chauvier propellers. The landing gear was fixed, with front wheels and rear fixed metal skid.

It was built by J. d'Alvear with his own resources and completed in October 1914. The aircraft was registered by letter patent 8563. The first flight occurred in November 1914 piloted by Ambrósio Caragiolla, who fatally crashed in February 1915 with this same aircraft.

It was the second aircraft built in Brazil and, with the exception of the French engine and propellers, employed domestic materials and components in its manufacture.

Specifications

References

External links
A photo of the Alvear

1910s Brazilian experimental aircraft
1910s Brazilian civil aircraft
Single-engined tractor aircraft
Monoplanes
Aircraft first flown in 1914
High-wing aircraft